Nanubhai Nichhabhai Patel (born 17 November 1905) was an Indian politician. He was member of the Lok Sabha the lower house of Indian Parliament from Bulsar, Gujarat in 1957,1962,1967 and 1971 as a member of the Indian National Congress and in 1977 as a Janata Party candidate.

References

External links
Official biographical sketch in Parliament of India website

Lok Sabha members from Gujarat
India MPs 1957–1962
India MPs 1962–1967
India MPs 1967–1970
India MPs 1971–1977
India MPs 1977–1979
People from Valsad district
1905 births
Year of death missing
Janata Party politicians
Indian National Congress politicians
Indian National Congress (Organisation) politicians
Praja Socialist Party politicians
Indian National Congress politicians from Gujarat